The information regarding List of rivers in the Coquimbo Region on this page has been compiled from the data supplied by GeoNames. It includes all features named "Rio", "Canal", "Arroyo", "Estero" and those Feature Code is associated with a stream of water. This list contains 121 water streams.

Content
This list contains:
 Name of the stream, in Spanish Language
 Coordinates are latitude and longitude of the feature in ± decimal degrees, at the mouth of the stream
 Link to a map including the Geonameid (a number which uniquely identifies a Geoname feature)
 Feature Code explained in 
 Other names for the same feature, if any
 Basin countries additional to Chile, if any

List

  Rio ElquiRío Elqui3890618STM(Rio Elaui, Rio Elqui, Río Elaui, Río Elqui)
  Rio ClaroRío Claro3894574STM(Rio Claro, Rio Derecho, Río Claro, Río Derecho)
  Rio CochiguasRío Cochiguas3894494STMCochiguaz
  Rio TurbioRío Turbio3868887STM
  Rio La LagunaRío La Laguna3885520STM(Rio La Laguna, Rio Laguna, Rio de la Laguna, Río La Laguna, Río Laguna, Río de la Laguna)
  Rio ToroRío Toro3869545STM
  Rio Vacas HeladasRío Vacas Heladas3868731STM
  Rio MaloRío Malo3880822STM(Rio Malo, Rio de los Banos, Río Malo, Río de los Baños)
  Quebrada de los Choros3894838STM(Quebrada Los Choros, Quebrada de los Choros, Rio Los Choros, Rio de los Choros, Río Los Choros)
  Quebrada Rio LisboaQuebrada Río Lisboa3873121STM
  Estero Punilla3874821STM
  Estero Negro3878813STM(Estero Negro, Quebrada del Negro)
  Estero de Pucalume3875108STM
  Estero de Guanta3888415STM(Estero Guanta, Estero Huanta, Estero Malposo de Guanta, Estero de Guanta)
  Estero Tilo3869826STM
  Rio IngaguasRío Ingaguas3887195STM
  Rio SecoRío Seco3871054STM
  Estero Lagunilla3885718STM(Estero Lagunilla, Estero Lagunillas, Quebrada Lagunilla, Quebrada Lagunillas)
  Rio LagunaRío Laguna3885783STM
  Rio La GloriaRío La Gloria3885860STM
  Rio ColoradoRío Colorado3894036STM
  Estero Tongoy3869637STM
  Rio TangueRío Tangue3870163STM(Quebrada Tangue, Rio Tangue, Río Tangue)(CL)
  Rio ChacayRío Chacay3895748STM(Quebrada de Chacay, Rio Chacay, Rio de Chacai, Río Chacay, Río de Chacai)
  Rio TerneroRío Ternero3869938STM
  Estero Aguada3900552STM
  Estero Ingenio3887189STM(Estero Ingenio, Quebrada del Ingenio)
  Estero Punitaqui3874811STM(Estero Punitaqui, Quebrada Punitaqui, Río Punitaqui, Río Punitaqui)
  Rio PonioRío Ponio3875458STM(Rio Campanario, Rio Ponio, Río Campanario, Río Ponio)
  Rio TomesRío Tomes3869649STM
  Rio LimariRío Limarí3883198STM
  Estero Punitaqui3874812STM
  Rio GrandeRío Grande3888780STM
  Rio GuatulameRío Guatulame3888321STM(Rio Guatalame, Rio Guatulame, Río Guatulame)
  Rio PamaRío Pama3877494STM
  Rio CogotiRío Cogotí3894438STM
  Rio CombarbalaRío Combarbalá3893961STM
  Rio RapelRío Rapel3873715STM
  Rio Los MollesRío Los Molles3881729STM(Rio Los Molles, Rio de las Molles, Río Los Molles, Río de las Molles)
  Rio Hurtado3887425STM(Rio Hurtado)
  Rio MostazalRío Mostazal3879250STM(Rio Mostazal, Rio Motazal, Río Mostazal, Río Motazal)
  Rio TascaderoRío Tascadero3870097STM
  Canal La Arena3886536DTCHI
  Rio PalomoRío Palomo3877550STM
  Estero Cachaco3897541STM
  Rio ColoradoRío Colorado3894035STM
  Canal Polqui3875487DTCHI
  Rio San MiguelRío San Miguel3871885STM
  Rio TulahuencitoRío Tulahuencito3868956STM
  Rio ChacayRío Chacay3895747STM
  Rio PatillosRío Patillos3876995STM
  Rio ColoradoRío Colorado3894034STM
  Estero de Quiles3874220STM
  Quebrada Almendro3900042STM(Estero Almendro, Quebrada Almendro)
  Estero Almendro3900044STM(Estero Almendro, Quebrada del Almendro)(CL)
  Rio TorcaRío Torca3869612STM
  Estero Peral3876583STM
  Rio TurbioRío Turbio3868886STM
  Rio GorditoRío Gordito3888884STM
  Quebrada ChepicaQuebrada Chépica3895253STM(Estero Chepica, Estero Chépica, Quebrada Chepic, Quebrada Chepica, Quebrada Chépica)
  Estero ChepicaEstero Chépica3895256STM
  Estero Valle Hermoso3868637STM(Estero Valle Hermoso, Quebrada Valle Hermoso)
  Quebrada Llampangui3883012STM(Quebrada Llampangui, Rio Llaucaven)
  Estero del Colihue3894251STM(Estero Colihue, Estero del Colihue)
  Estero Llano Largo3882967STM
  Estero del Cobre3894518STM
  Estero Canaleta3897029STM
  Rio NegroRío Negro3878787STM
  Quebrada Almendro3900041STM(Estero Almendro, Quebrada Almendro)
  Estero de la Yerba Loca3867676STM
  Estero Carrizo3896451STM
  Estero Olla3878091STM
  Estero Cenicero3896016STM
  Rio Tres QuebradasRío Tres Quebradas3869138STM
  Estero ChanarEstero Chañar3895563STM
  Quebrada Negra3878920STM(Estero del Agua Negra, Quebrada Negra)
  Estero Burras3897695STM
  Estero Corico3893561STM
  Rio CarenRío Carén3896671STM
  Estero Canela3896950STM
  Estero Polcura3875533STM(Estero Polcura, Rio Los Estero Polcura, Río Los Estero Polcura)
  Estero Millahue3879881STM
  Rio ChoapaRío Choapa3894913STM(Chuapa, Rio Choapa, Rio Choapo, Río Choapa, Río Choapo)
  Rio IllapelRío Illapel3887342STM
  Estero AucoEstero Auco3899144STM(Estero Auco, Estero Aucó)
  Estero Camisas3897138STM(Estero Camisas)
  Rio ChalingaRío Chalinga3895622STM
  Rio CuncumenRío Cuncumén3892971STM
  Rio Los HeladosRío Los Helados3882020STM(Helados, Rio Los Helados, Río Los Helados)
  Estero Puertecillas3875001STM
  Estero La Canela3886360STM
  Estero TomeEstero Tomé3869656STM
  Estero Cunlagua3892962STM
  Estero LimahuidaEstero Limáhuida3883204STM
  Estero Chigualoco3950082STM
  Estero Piuquenes3875725STM
  Rio de los PelambresRío de los Pelambres3876804STM(Estero Pelambres, Rio de los Pelambres, Río de los Pelambres)
  Rio Cerro BlancoRío Cerro Blanco3895863STM
  Estero de QuelenEstero de Quelén3874435STM
  Estero PupioEstero Pupío3874671STM
  Estero CavilolenEstero Cavilolén3896079STM
  Estero Conchali3950056STM
  Rio del ValleRío del Valle3868660STM
  Estero Durazno3892121STM
  Quebrada Manzano3880604STM(Estero del Manzano, Quebrada Manzano)
  Rio PortilloRío Portillo3875376STM
  Rio AlitreRío Alitre3900080STM
  Estero Mauro3880293STM(Estero Mauro, Quebrada Mauro)
  Rio GonzalezRío González3888905STM
  Estero Ojotas3878120STM
  Rio YunqueRío Yunque3867605STM
  Rio del TotoralRío del Totoral3869428STM
  Rio de la ChicharraRío de la Chicharra3895210STM(Estero Chicharra, Rio de La Chicharra, Rio de la Chicharra, Río de La Chicharra, Río de la Chicharra)
  Estero de Barraza3898692STM
  Estero Colorado3894055STM
  Rio LeivaRío Leiva3883427STM
  Estero Potrero Largo3875268STM
  Estero de la Yaretas3867734STM(Estero de la Yaretas, Rio de las Llaretas, Río de las Llaretas)
  Rio BlancoRío Blanco3898217STM
  Estero Angostura3899603STM
  Rio de las LlaretasRío de las Llaretas3882934STM
  Rio QuilimariRío Quilimarí3874201STM

See also
 List of lakes in Chile
 List of volcanoes in Chile
 List of islands of Chile
 List of fjords, channels, sounds and straits of Chile
 List of lighthouses in Chile

Notes

References

External links
 Rivers of Chile
 Base de Datos Hidrográfica de Chile
 

Coquimbo